Donald Sinclair "Don" Davis (August 4, 1942 – June 29, 2008) was an American character actor best known for playing General Hammond in the television series Stargate SG-1 (1997–2007), and earlier for playing Major Garland Briggs on the television series Twin Peaks (1990–1991). He was also a  theater professor, painter, and United States Army captain.

Early life and education
Davis was born and raised in Aurora, Missouri.  He earned a Bachelor of Science degree in theater and art from Southwest Missouri State College.  He said that "during the Vietnam era" he "was with the 7th Infantry in Korea" and at another point was "a personnel and administration officer; I ran records branches." He was a captain at Fort Leonard Wood by the time he left the U.S. Army, "and worked with General Officers, so I've been able to use that in Hammond and other characters."

In 1970 he received a Master's Degree in Theatre from the Southern Illinois University Carbondale (SIU); his thesis was "Design and Construction of Stage Settings for Black Comedy and The Two Executioners". He taught for several years before returning to SIUC to complete a Ph.D. degree in Theatre; his dissertation was "The Evolution of Scenography in the Western Theater".

He began working in the film industry in the 1980s, while teaching at the University of British Columbia. In 1987, he stopped teaching in order to pursue acting full-time.

Career
Davis stated that he landed the role of the eloquently spoken Major Briggs when "I was living in Vancouver and doing local work.  But because of my accent in the '80s I couldn't play a Canadian in commercials. So someone suggested that I get an agent in Seattle. I did and was able to get commercial work and acting jobs there. I had a good resume. So when they were casting the Twin Peaks pilot my agent sent me out to the audition. I met series creator David Lynch and didn't actually read for him—we just visited. ... David liked me and started writing for me. He liked the chemistry I had with other players. I did three days on the pilot and then went on to the series. That was the luckiest break I could have had. There are at least a dozen people from that show who are lifelong friends because of that show. It was a life-changing experience."

In the TV show MacGyver, Davis was the stunt/photography double for Dana Elcar. He was often mistaken for Elcar, and vice versa. Davis did appear in two episodes of MacGyver, as a different character each time. His first appearance was as a cement truck driver in the episode "Blow Out", and his second appearance was as the poacher Wyatt Porter in "The Endangered". He also played Dana Scully's father in the series The X-Files. Canadian audiences may also be familiar with Davis thanks to his appearance in one of the famous Heritage Minutes, in which he played an arrogant American gold prospector who pulls a gun on Mountie Sam Steele. He also played the role of the Racine Belles' manager in the movie A League of Their Own. He also had a guest-starring role in the pilot episode of the comedy-drama television series Psych, playing the character of Mr. McCallum.

He was a member of the main cast of Stargate SG-1 during the first seven seasons of that television series, portraying General Hammond, commander of Stargate Command (SGC). He appeared in a recurring role during Seasons 8 to 10, cutting back his commitment due to health problems. He also played the character in one episode of the Stargate spin-off series Stargate Atlantis.

Later life and death
Davis, who was living in Gibsons, British Columbia, Canada, died on June 29, 2008, two months before his 66th birthday. Davis had heart disease and diabetes - he had a fatal heart attack. He was cremated and his ashes were scattered into the Pacific Ocean. 

The writers of Stargate Atlantis paid him homage by mentioning the death of his character George Hammond and naming a spaceship after him in the final episode of the show airing January 9, 2009. He was again honored in October 2009, with the appearance of the spaceship Hammond in the pilot episode of Stargate Universe. Coincidentally, in episode 16 of season 4 of SG-1, "2010" (an episode set in the future which originally aired in January 2001), it is stated that General Hammond had died of a heart attack prior to the episode's events.

Personal life
Davis married Ruby Fleming in 2003, by which time he had a son, Matt Davis, from a previous marriage. He was given a GMC Envoy as a gift from the producers of Stargate SG-1 which his son still drives to this day. He was also a visual artist, spending most of his free time painting or carving. Davis grew up painting, sculpting and drawing. He continued to pursue these crafts his entire life, supplementing his income with design commissions and art sales. On the DVD commentary track for Stargate SG-1 season 6 episode 17 ("Disclosure"), Davis said that he once had a job carving wooden cigar store Indians that were sold at Silver Dollar City.

Selected filmography

The Journey of Natty Gann (1985) — Railroad Brakeman
Malone (1987) — Buddy
Stakeout (1987) — Prison Gate Guard
Watchers (1988) — Veterinarian
Beyond the Stars (1989) — Phil Clawson
Look Who's Talking (1989) — Dr. Fleischer
Cadence (1990) — Haig (uncredited)
Look Who's Talking Too (1990) — Dr. Fleischer
Omen IV: The Awakening (1991, TV movie) — Jake Madison
Chaindance (1991) — Sergeant
Mystery Date (1991) — Doheny
The Gambler Returns: The Luck of the Draw (1991, TV movie) — Rodeo announcer
Hook (1991) — Dr. Fields
Kuffs (1992) — Police gun instructor
Twin Peaks: Fire Walk with Me (1992) — Maj. Garland Briggs (scenes deleted)
A League of Their Own (1992) — Charlie Collins (Racine coach)
Cliffhanger (1993) — Stuart
Needful Things (1993) — Reverend Willie Rose
Max (1994) — Earl Pomerance
Hideaway (1995) — Dr. Martin
The Fan (1996) — Stook
Alaska (1996) — Sergeant Grazer
Prisoner of Zenda, Inc. (1996, TV movie) — Colonel Zapf
Volcano: Fire on the Mountain (1997, TV movie) — Mayor Bob Hart
Dad's Week Off (1997, TV movie) — Hank
Con Air (1997) — Man driving Volvo
Suspicious River (2000) — Golf shirt man
Best in Show (2000) — Mayflower Best in Show Judge Everett Bainbridge
The 6th Day (2000) — Cardinal de la Jolla
Deadly Little Secrets (2002) — The Chief
G.I. Joe: Spy Troops — The movie (2003, TV movie) — Wild Bill (voice)
Miracle (2004) — Bob Fleming
Stargate: SG3000 (2004, Short) — Computer Representation of George Hammond (voice)
Savage Island (2004) — Keith Young
Meltdown (2004, TV movie) — NRC Carl Mansfield
G.I. Joe: Valor vs. Venom (2004) — Wild Bill (voice)
The Still Life (2006) — Mr. Fernot
Seed (2006) — Davis
Beneath (2007) — Joseph
Beyond Loch Ness (2008, TV movie) — Neil Chapman
Stargate: Continuum (2008) — Lt. Gen. George Hammond
Vipers (2008, TV movie) — Dr. Silverton
Far Cry (2008) — General Roderick
The Uninvited (2009) — Mr. Henson
Wyvern (2008, TV movie) — Colonel Travis Sherman (dedicated to Davis)
Stargate SG-1: Children of the Gods - Final Cut (2009) — Maj. Gen. George Hammond (dedicated to Davis)
Woodshop (2009) — Principal Jamison
Twin Peaks: The Missing Pieces (2014) — Major Garland Briggs

Partial television credits

MacGyver (1985–1991) — stunt double for Dana Elcar
21 Jump Street (1987) — Principal Harris, and (1988) — Frank
Booker (1989) — Sheriff
L.A. Law (1990) - Judge Richard Bartke
Twin Peaks (1990–1991) — Major Garland Briggs
Columbo: A Bird in the Hand (1992) — Bertie
Highlander: The Series (1993) — Palance
The X-Files (1994) — Captain William Scully (2 episodes)
Madison (1994—1996) — Mr. Winslow (7 episodes)
Black Fox (1995 miniseries) — Sergeant
The Outer Limits (1995) — General Callahan, Detective Wilson
Poltergeist: The Legacy (1996) — Harold Taggart
In Cold Blood (1996 miniseries)
Viper (1996) — Lloyd
Stargate SG-1 (1997–2007) — Major General/Lieutenant General George Hammond
Atomic Train (1999 miniseries) — General Harlan Ford
The Chris Isaak Show (2002) — Del
Just Cause (2002) — Thornton
The Twilight Zone (2003) — Dr. Tate
Stargate Atlantis (2004) — Major General George Hammond
Andromeda (2004) — Avineri
NCIS (2004) — MTAC Control Officer
The West Wing (2005) — Reverend Don Butler
The Dead Zone (2005) — Senator Harlan Ellis (3 episodes)
Psych (2006) - Mr. McCallum
Supernatural (2007) — Trotter
Flash Gordon (2007) — Mr. Mitchell
Burn Up (2008 miniseries) — The Man
Twin Peaks: The Return (2017) — Major Garland Briggs (archival footage)

References

External links

1942 births
2008 deaths
Male actors from Missouri
American male film actors
American male television actors
American male voice actors
Missouri State University alumni
People from Aurora, Missouri
Southern Illinois University Carbondale alumni
United States Army officers
Academic staff of the University of British Columbia
20th-century American male actors